Shrink Rap may refer to:

 Shrink Rap (TV series), British talk show hosted by Pamela Stephenson
 "Shrink Rap" (Frasier), a season 3 episode of Frasier
 "Shrink Rap" (Las Vegas), a season 5 episode of Las Vegas
 "Shrink Rap" (Dave the Barbarian), a season 1 episode of Dave the Barbarian
 Shrink Rap, a novel by Robert B. Parker
 Shrink Rap, film starring Linden Ashby
 "Shrinkrap", a song from the 1991 album by Robert Wyatt, Dondestan

See also 
 Shrink wrap (disambiguation)